Alice River is an outer suburb in the City of Townsville, Queensland, Australia. In the  Alice River had a population of 2,425 people.

It is also known as Rupertswood.

History 
The estate is also known as Rupertswood, because the estate was named by the developer who was Sir Rupert Clarke, 3rd Baronet of Rupertswood, after his ancestral home "Rupertswood" at Sunbury, Victoria, Australia. However, Alice River was named by one of the Bell & Reid party in 1865 for a lady of his acquaintance. The suburb along with its neighbour Rangewood, Queensland are up and coming suburbs with numerous housing developments expected in future due to the ample availability of flat develop-able land and close proximity to the Townsville Orbital road and James Cook University. Existing suburbs to the east are almost entirely built out with only some subdivision of smaller parcels and in-fill development possible.

In the  Alice River had a population of 2,425 people.

Geography
The Hervey Range Developmental Road runs along the northern boundary.

Facilities 
There is a shop, an Australia Post mail box, a public phone box, and service station located on Hervey Range Road which is the main road passing the village.

Also, there are tennis courts, a cricket ground, community hall, Scout hall, pony club, playground area, half basketball court and barbecue area which is floodlit at night along with public toilets and Rupertswood Rural Fire Brigade Station. All of these facilities are located in the large central park area which the acreage housing surrounds.

The Rupertswood Village consists of around 600 homes. The actual suburb of Alice River is much larger than the Rupertswood village but mainly consists of rural cattle properties.

See also
 Alice River (disambiguation)

References

External links
 former Thuringowa City Council
 New Townsville city website
 History of the area
 More history of Thuringowa, including searchable historical image collection - from Thuringowa Library Heritage Services
 

Suburbs of Townsville